Political symbolism is symbolism that is used to represent a political standpoint or party.

Political symbols simplify and “summarize” the political structures and practices for which they stand; can connect institutions and beliefs with emotions; can help make a polity or political movement more cohesive. People fit themselves to words as much as they bend them to their own purposes. Different groups and individuals can interpret symbols differently because they all have the capacity to create the virtual reality within which they operate. The symbolism can occur in various media including banners, pictures, and flags. For example, Red flags have traditionally been flown by socialists, left-wing radicals, and communist groups to represent the "blood of the workers". Black flags have traditionally been flown by anarchism, and left-wing radicals to represent the absence of all oppressive structures. A combination of the two colors in a black flag represents social anarchism, such as anarchist communism and anarcho syndicalism.    

Many groups use the political colour associated with their political philosophy, for example blue, particularly dark blue, is often associated with conservative parties.

Cultural groups may use symbols in what many consider to be a political way, for example LGBT symbols like the Rainbow flag are used to promote the political goal of LGBT rights.

Individual parties often associate, officially or unofficially, with symbols — sometimes adopting or incorporating symbolism associated with ideologies they support. In some democracies these symbols are regulated by law, for example, in the United Kingdom, political symbols are regulated by the Electoral Commission. In some countries, political symbols appear on ballot papers. These are known as electoral symbols and one of their functions is to help illiterate voters identify parties.

See also

References 

Symbolism